Joe Ruback, better known as License Plate Guy (born June 7, 1969), is an iconic fan of the New York Giants, best known for the license plates he wears at each game and his presence at most Giants games in general. Ruback went to all 283 games (272 regular season and eleven playoff games) the team played at Giants Stadium. He has attended every Giants home and away game since 2000, except during the 2020 NFL season in which fans were not permitted to attend due to the COVID-19 pandemic.

Ruback first wore a plate to a game when he was 16, but the tradition of license plates did not become what it is now until the last decade. He now boasts a collection of over 100 Giants-themed plates.   

Joe Ruback has made several appearances on The Boomer & Carton radio show on WFAN in New York. Ruback has become a fan favorite, but prides himself as "an average fan" and can be seen before every game (home and away) in the parking lot taking pictures with fans.. Joe has also been featured on NFL Network and Good Day New York.

Philanthropy
Ruback participates in many off the field philanthropic endeavors including "Pink Tailgate" raising money and awareness for breast cancer and those affected.

In 2017, Ruback organized a charity softball game to raise money for the Tom Coughlin Jay Fund.  Working with Landon Collins, who headlined the event, a softball match was organized between current and past Giants team members. The event also featured a dodgeball game and a home run derby.

Legal Troubles
Ruback was arrested on possible affiliation of loan sharking, extortion, and grand larceny; however charges in a 2014 case were dropped in 2016. The New York Giants have stated they have no affiliation with Ruback and he does not represent the New York Giants in any capacity. Ruback regularly uses his social media platform and memorabilia connection to support the Giants community. He has donated items in his collection of Giants memorabilia to online raffles to support fans and former players in trying times. He has also previously partnered with players on the Giants to distribute unused tickets to fans who have trouble affording tickets.

See also
Barrel Man
Chief Zee 
Crazy Ray 
Fireman Ed
Hogettes 
Bleacher Creatures

References

Living people
New York Giants
Spectators of American football
Vehicle registration plates of the United States
1969 births